Battenin is a protein that in humans is encoded by the CLN3 gene located on chromosome 16. Battenin is not clustered into any Pfam clan, but it is included in the TCDB suggesting that it is a transporter. In humans, it belongs to the atypical SLCs due to its structural and phylogenetic similarity to other SLC transporters.

Function 

Battenin is involved in lysosomal function. Many alternatively spliced transcript variants have been found for this gene.

Battenin is a transmembrane protein predicted to be composed of 11 transmembrane helices, yet no crystal structure is available.

Clinical significance

Mutations in this gene, as well as other neuronal ceroid-lipofuscinosis (CLN) genes, cause neurodegenerative diseases commonly known as Batten disease, also known as Juvenile Neuronal Ceroid Lipofuscinosis (JNCL) or Juvenile Batten disease.

References

Further reading

External links 
 
  GeneReviews/NCBI/NIH/UW entry on Neuronal Ceroid-Lipofuscinoses